Jefferson Riverport International (commonly called Riverport) is a planned industrial community on the Ohio River, home to companies engaged in manufacturing or distribution. It is one of the few inland industrial/port sites in the nation with single-line haul by three railroads: CSX, Norfolk Southern and Paducah & Louisville. It was established in the mid-1970s. The industrial park contains a variety of manufacturing and industrial production, as well as distribution and international trade. There is a Foreign Trade Zone in Riverport, designated as #29, with customs clearance in Louisville.

Riverport companies
This list of current companies is incomplete.

References

External links
 
 Jefferson Riverport International - Companies

Economy of Louisville, Kentucky
Transportation in Louisville, Kentucky
Foreign trade zones of the United States
Industrial parks in the United States
River ports of the United States
Organizations established in the 1970s
1970s establishments in Kentucky